Nagelius is a genus of beetles belonging to the family Histeridae.

Species:
 Nagelius carinicollis (Lewis, 1893) 
 Nagelius castelnaudi (Marseul, 1870) 
 Nagelius limatulus (Lewis, 1892) 
 Nagelius turgidulus Mazur, 2007

References

Histeridae